Coqên County is a county in the Ngari Prefecture, in the west of the Tibet Autonomous Region of China. It is the located in the southeast of Ngari Prefecture.

Settlements

Asog

See also
 Semo La

References 

Counties of Tibet
Ngari Prefecture